David Henry Von Ancken (December 5, 1964 – July 26, 2021) was an American film, television director and screenwriter.

Career
He directed one feature film, the 2006 Western Seraphim Falls starring Liam Neeson and Pierce Brosnan.

Some of Von Ancken's credits as a television director include Oz, Without a Trace, Numb3rs, The Shield, Heroes, Gossip Girl, CSI: NY, Cold Case, Californication, Tut, Ghost Wars, Hell on Wheels, The Vampire Diaries and The InBetween.

Von Ancken died on July 26, 2021, at his home in Agoura Hills, California, after battling against stomach cancer. He was 56.

Filmography

Film

Television

References

External links
 

1964 births
2021 deaths
American male screenwriters
American male television writers
American people of Flemish descent
American television directors
Deaths from cancer in California
Deaths from stomach cancer
Film directors from New York City
Screenwriters from New York (state)
Television producers from New York (state)
Western (genre) film directors
Writers from New York City